Ursula Andress (born 19 March 1936) is a Swiss-German actress, former model and sex symbol who has appeared in American, British and Italian films. Her breakthrough role was as Bond girl Honey Ryder in the first James Bond film, Dr. No (1962). She later starred as Vesper Lynd in the 1967 Bond parody Casino Royale. Other credits include Fun in Acapulco (1963), 4 for Texas (1963), She (1965), The 10th Victim (1965), The Blue Max (1966), The Southern Star (1969), Perfect Friday (1970), Red Sun (1971), The Sensuous Nurse (1975), Slave of the Cannibal God (1978), The Fifth Musketeer (1979), Clash of the Titans (1981), and Peter the Great (1986).

Early life
Andress, the third of six children, was born in Ostermundigen, Canton of Bern, to a Swiss mother, Anna, and Rolf Andress, a German diplomat. Her father was expelled from Switzerland for political reasons and her grandfather, a garden designer, took the role of being her guardian. She has a brother, Heinz, and four sisters, Erika, Charlotte, Gisela, and Kàtey.

She went to school in Bern until she was 16 and speaks several languages, including English, French, German, and Italian. She studied art in Paris for a year, then went to Rome, where she held down jobs including being a nanny for children.

Career

Andress was at a party when she met a film producer who offered her a screen test for a role in an Italian film. She was successful and was cast in walk-on parts in An American in Rome (1954) (starring Alberto Sordi), The Sins of Casanova (1955) (starring later Bond ally Gabriele Ferzetti), and La catena dell'odio (1955). She was seen by a Hollywood executive who persuaded her to try her luck in Hollywood.

Andress arrived in Hollywood in late 1955. That spring she was signed to a seven-year contract with Paramount Pictures, starting at $287 a week. 
The contract resulted in no acting roles, owing to her reluctance to learn English at the time. "I spent most of my time watching old Marlene Dietrich movies", she said. Andress did receive some publicity for dating James Dean shortly before the actor's death. She bought herself out of her contract. In 1956 it was announced she signed to Columbia Pictures. She made no films for them either. She stayed in Hollywood because she married John Derek in 1957. In 1959, it was announced she and Derek would star in a film, High Variety, but no film resulted. 

Andress returned to screens in 1962 in an episode of Thriller, "La Strega" (1962), with Alejandro Rey. She became internationally famous as Honey Ryder, a shell diver and James Bond's object of desire in Dr. No (1962), the first Bond film, even though her dialogue had to be dubbed by Nikki van der Zyl. In what became an iconic moment in cinematic and fashion history, she rose out of the Caribbean Sea in a white bikini sporting a large diving knife on her hip. The calypso was sung by Diana Coupland. The scene made Andress a "quintessential" Bond girl. Andress later said that she owed her career to that white bikini: "This bikini made me into a success. As a result of starring in Dr. No as the first Bond girl, I was given the freedom to take my pick of future roles and to become financially independent". The bikini she wore in the film sold at auction in 2001 for £41,125. In 2003, in a UK Survey by Channel 4, her entrance in Dr. No was voted #1 in "the 100 Greatest Sexy Moments". Andress won the Golden Globe Award for New Star of the Year in 1964 for her appearance in the film.

Andress followed it playing the female lead in an Elvis Presley musical, Fun in Acapulco (1963). She was billed after Frank Sinatra, Dean Martin, and Anita Ekberg in 4 for Texas (1963); her casting in the latter led to the title being changed from Two for Texas. Both films were widely seen. Less so was a film Andress starred in alongside Derek, Nightmare in the Sun (1965).

In 1965, nude photographs of her from Nightmare in the Sun were published in Playboy; it was the first of seven times she was pictured in the magazine over the next fifteen years. When asked why she had agreed to do the Playboy shoot, Andress replied coolly, "Because I'm beautiful".

Andress was cast in the title role of She (1965), playing an immortal queen, for Hammer Films and Seven Arts Productions, shot in England and Israel. Andress agreed to make it as part of a two-picture deal with Seven Arts; it was a financial success at the box office. Andress did not appear in the sequel, The Vengeance of She, as her contract expired before the film was produced.

Andress had a supporting role in the comedy What's New Pussycat? (1965) for producer Charles K. Feldman which was a huge hit. She went to France to play Jean-Paul Belmondo's love interest in Up to His Ears (1965), which was popular in France; she and Belmondo became romantically involved, leading to her and Derek divorcing (although they had already been separated for a year). Andress moved to Paris to live with Belmondo and it was her home for the next seven years.

In Italy, she starred opposite Marcello Mastroianni in the science fiction movie The 10th Victim (1965). She returned to Hollywood to play George Peppard's love interest in the World War One film The Blue Max (1966), another success at the box office.

Andress made her second film for Seven Arts: another with Derek, who again starred and directed, Once Before I Die (1966), shot in the Philippines. More widely seen was the Bond satire Casino Royale (1967), also produced by Feldman, where Andress played Vesper Lynd, an occasional spy who persuades Evelyn Tremble, played by Peter Sellers, to carry out a mission. It was a big box office hit. Her fee was a reported £200,000. Val Guest directed Andress in Casino Royale and said "I don't think I have ever met someone who was so universally loved by everyone in a studio. They'd all do anything for her and this is really quite something. One day someone is going to get the real Ursula on the screen in a comedy and she's going to astound everybody. The trouble is that she's so tense".

In Italy, she appeared alongside fellow former Bond girl Claudine Auger in Anyone Can Play (1968) for director Luigi Zampa. She then went to Africa to make The Southern Star (1969) with George Segal, which was a hit in England. She appeared nude or semi-nude in nearly all of her film roles between 1969 and 1979, earning her the nickname "Ursula Undress".

Andress went to England to appear in Perfect Friday (1970), a heist film starring Stanley Baker and David Warner. In Spain. she appeared in Red Sun (1971), a Western with an international cast including Charles Bronson, Toshiro Mifune, and Alain Delon. In a 1972 interview, she said "I think my image, especially to Americans, is that of a femme fatale, a man-eating woman. I'm not empty-headed or calculating and cool. But maybe my looks give that impression. I'm disciplined in my doings and undisciplined in my emotions. I can't control the things I feel or hide my feelings".

Andress did some action films, Stateline Motel (1973), Loaded Guns (1975), and Africa Express (1975). She played the title role in The Sensuous Nurse (1975) and did a comedy with another former Bond girl, Barbara Bouchet, Spogliamoci così, senza pudor... (1976).

Andress played Joséphine de Beauharnais in the swashbuckling spoof The Loves and Times of Scaramouche (1976) with Michael Sarrazin. She made a sequel to Africa Express, Safari Express (1976), then did another with Mastroianni, Double Murder (1978).

Andress was in the cult favorite Slave of the Cannibal God (1978) with Stacy Keach; the anthology sex comedy Tigers in Lipstick (1979) for Luigi Zampa; and the swashbuckler period piece The Fifth Musketeer (1979), playing Louise de La Vallière opposite Beau Bridges.

She played Aphrodite in 1981's Clash of the Titans, alongside Laurence Olivier. During the making of the film, Andress started a romantic relationship with leading man Harry Hamlin, with whom she had a son.

In 1982, she portrayed Mabel Dodge in the adventure-drama film Red Bells and guest starred on shows like Manimal and The Love Boat. In France. she was in Liberté, égalité, choucroute (1985).

On television, she participated in the 1986 Emmy-winning miniseries Peter the Great, and joined the cast of the primetime soap opera Falcon Crest for a three-episode arc in 1988 as an exotic foreigner who assists David Selby in retrieving Dana Sparks from a white slave ring. Andress was also in Big Man – The Diva (1988) with Bud Spencer and Man Against the Mob: The Chinatown Murders (1989).

Since the beginning of the 1990s, her acting appearances have been rare. She was in Klassäzämekunft (1990) (English title: Broken Silence), The Cave of the Golden Rose 3 (1993), The Cave of the Golden Rose 4 (1994) and Cremaster 5 (1995). In 1995, Andress was chosen by Empire magazine as one of the "100 Sexiest Stars in film history." Her last role to date was playing "Madonna" in the low-budget 2005 Swiss feature  (English title: The Bird Preachers). She appeared in the documentary Masterpiece or Forgery? The Story of Elmyr De Hory (2008).

Personal life 
Andress has stated that she lost her virginity to married French actor Daniel Gelin in 1953, when she was 17 and he was 32. She dated Dennis Hopper and James Dean after moving to the US in 1955, and that same year began an affair with actor/director John Derek, a married father of two who walked out on his wife, Pati Behrs, and their family to be with 19-year-old Andress. Derek and Andress wed in 1957 in Las Vegas, but separated in 1964 over her affair with Once Before I Die co-star Ron Ely, officially divorcing in 1966. During the interim, the separated but still married Andress publicly dated John Richardson, her co-star from She, and Marcello Mastroianni, her co-star from The 10th Victim.

From 1965 to 1972, Andress lived with her Up to His Ears co-star Jean-Paul Belmondo. He was, she says, the love of her life. Her next live-in relationship was with another co-star, Stateline Motel'''s Fabio Testi, from 1973 to 1977 (except for one year when they broke up). She also dated Ryan O'Neal, John Delorean, Helmut Berger, Paolo Pazzaglia, Johnny Dorelli, Franco Nero, with whom she later starred in Red Bells, Nels Van Patten, and Ricci Martin.

When Andress broke her arm in late summer 1978, the official story had it that she'd been struck by Hurricane Norman while bodysurfing in Malibu, but rumors flew that she actually suffered the injury during a fight with her on-again/off-again boyfriend O'Neal. O'Neal and Andress were in a relationship twice, first from 1972 to 1973, then again from 1977 to 1978.

Andress was in a relationship with actor Harry Hamlin, who is 15 years her junior, after meeting on the set of Clash of the Titans in 1979. At the age of 44, she gave birth to their son, Dimitri Alexander Hamlin, on 19 May 1980. The night of her delivery, Linda Evans drove Andress to the hospital while Evans' assistant Bunky Young retrieved Hamlin from the set of King of the Mountain''. Although she was engaged to Hamlin, the couple never married. In 1983, Hamlin broke up with her.

In the mid-1980s, Andress was romantically involved with Brazilian football player Paulo Roberto Falcão, actor Gerardo Amato, singer Julio Iglesias, real estate developer Stan Herman, and Greek bodybuilder Mario Natokis. In 1986, she began dating future Sicilian Regional Assembly member Fausto Fagone, then an economics student at university; he was 20 and she was 50. The relationship, which infuriated Fagone's parents, lasted until 1991. Later that year, Andress briefly dated martial arts expert Jeff Speakman, but has not been publicly linked with anyone since.

In 2017, Andress sold her home in Beverly Hills at a considerable profit. As of 2022, Andress splits her time between an apartment in Rome and a house in Gstaad, near her siblings. Her preferred language is Italian.

Filmography

Film

Television

References

External links 

 
 

1936 births
Living people
People from Bern-Mittelland District
People from Ostermundigen
Swiss female models
Swiss people of German descent
Swiss-German people
Swiss film actresses
Swiss television actresses
20th-century Swiss actresses
21st-century Swiss actresses
New Star of the Year (Actress) Golden Globe winners
United Service Organizations entertainers